Allium bigelovii, the New Mexico wild leek, is a plant species native to Arizona and southwestern New Mexico.

The specific epithet honors John Milton Bigelow (based on the Latinized form of his surname, Bigelovius).

References

bigelovii
Flora of Arizona
Flora of New Mexico
Endemic flora of the United States
Plants described in 1871
Taxa named by Sereno Watson